Charles West Day (July 1, 1836 – February 25, 1906) was an American lumberman, merchant, farmer, and politician.

Born in Jefferson County, New York, Day moved with his family to Wisconsin in 1849 and settled in Wrightstown, Brown County, Wisconsin. In 1884, Day moved his family to De Pere, Wisconsin. He was in the lumber business, merchant, and farmer In 1887, Day served in the Wisconsin State Senate and was a Republican.

Notes

External links

1836 births
1906 deaths
People from De Pere, Wisconsin
People from Jefferson County, New York
Businesspeople from Wisconsin
Farmers from Wisconsin
Republican Party Wisconsin state senators
People from Wrightstown, Wisconsin
19th-century American politicians